The Atlantic Coast Line Passenger Depot  was a historic Atlantic Coast Line Railroad depot in Sarasota, Florida, United States. It was located at 1 South School Avenue.

History
The Tampa Southern Railroad began service through Sarasota in May 1924. The first passenger train arrived in December 1924 at the freight and temporary passenger station north of Fruitville Road. A permanent Atlantic Coast Line passenger depot, Sarasota Station, was constructed in 1925. The architect was Alpheus M. Griffin.

In 1967, Atlantic Coast Line (ACL) and Seaboard Air Line Railway (SAL) merged as the Seaboard Coast Line Railroad (SCL). The West Coast Champion made its last run to Sarasota and Venice from Boston and New York on May 1, 1971.

On March 22, 1984, the depot was added to the U.S. National Register of Historic Places. Two years later, it was demolished.  It was delisted from the National Register on July 25, 2018.

Gallery

References

Railway stations on the National Register of Historic Places in Florida
S
Sarasota
Transportation buildings and structures in Sarasota County, Florida
Buildings and structures completed in 1925
Buildings and structures demolished in 1986
Former National Register of Historic Places in Florida